PureH is a Slovenian electronic music group formed in 1993, when their first tape Inertia appeared. Before that they were gathering experiences as musicians in several bands (Extreme Smoke, D.T.W., Patareni, etc.) The group initially consisted of a producer and video artist. After performing at the festival Break21, the group was joined by a drummer, guitarist and bass player. PureH have appeared on various compilation CDs, festivals, TV/radio commercials, World exhibition Expo 2000 and have received Bumerang 2000 alternative music award for experimental music. The remix album Signia was released in 2007 with artists KK Null, Eraldo Bernocchi, Surgeon, Psychedelic Desert, Chris Wood, P.C.M. and others. They release their albums for one of the leading alternative record companies in Slovenia.

Discography

Albums
 1994: Inertia
 1996: Chinacat
 1999: Autistic
 2005: Anadonia
 2007: Signia

Videography
 1999: Short Movies for Videowalls

References

External links
PureH Official website
PureH Magazine Articles - 1
PureH Magazine Articles - 2
PureH discography @ Discogs.com
PureH Facebook page
[ Allmusic]

Intelligent dance musicians
Musical groups established in 1994
Slovenian industrial music groups
Slovenian electronic music groups
Slovenian alternative rock groups
Drum and bass music groups
Ambient music groups